Desmond Alfred Barchard is a New Zealand former rugby league footballer, and coach who represented and coached New Zealand. Barchard was the coach of the Kiwis in the 1968 and 1972 World Cups. His uncle, Len Barchard also played for New Zealand, while his other uncle, Laurie Barchard played senior rugby league for City for several years.

Playing career
A member of the Marist club in the Auckland Rugby League, Barchard first represented Auckland in 1948. He was selected for the New Zealand national rugby league team in 1947 (Kiwi No. 307) and went on to play in ten Test matches for New Zealand (1947, 48, 50-52). In 1953, his final year of representative football for Auckland, he was drawn into the touring US All Stars side as they were short of players for their New Zealand leg of the tour.

Des was awarded Honorary Life Membership of the Howick Hornets RLFC (Auckland) for service to the Club as a founding member.

Coaching career
Barchard was the coach of the New Zealand national rugby league team at the 1968 and 1972 World Cups. The Kiwis did not win a match in either tournament.

References

Living people
Auckland rugby league team players
Marist Saints players
New Zealand national rugby league team coaches
New Zealand national rugby league team players
New Zealand rugby league coaches
New Zealand rugby league players
Rugby league five-eighths
Rugby league halfbacks
Rugby league players from the Auckland Region
United States national rugby league team players
Year of birth missing (living people)